Mammillaria brandegeei is a species of cactus in the subfamily Cactoideae.

References

brandegeei
Plants described in 1897